Jeanne McGahey (died 1995 or 1996) was an American poet published by George Leite in Circle Magazine in the 1940s.  She married the poet Lawrence Hart in 1944; they were both members of the "Activist Group" of poets.

References

Year of birth missing
1990s deaths
American women poets
20th-century American poets
20th-century American women writers